Mieke Sterk (born 5 January 1946) is a retired track and field athlete and politician from the Netherlands. She was part of the Dutch 4×100 m relay team that finished in fourth place at the 1968 Summer Olympics. Individually, she failed to reach the final in the 200 m event. Two years later she won a bronze medal in the pentathlon at the 1970 Universiade and finished fifth in the 60 m hurdles at the European Indoor Championships. Her personal bests were 11.6 seconds in the 100 m (1968) and 23.5 seconds in the 200 m (1973). After retiring from athletics she became involved in politics and between 1994 and 1998 was a member of the Tweede Kamer of the Dutch House of Representatives.

References

1946 births
Living people
Athletes (track and field) at the 1968 Summer Olympics
Dutch female hurdlers
Dutch pentathletes
Dutch female sprinters
Olympic athletes of the Netherlands
Sportspeople from Haarlem
Labour Party (Netherlands) politicians
Members of the House of Representatives (Netherlands)
Universiade medalists in athletics (track and field)
Universiade bronze medalists for the Netherlands
Medalists at the 1970 Summer Universiade
20th-century Dutch women